James Hoyle may refer to:

John Hoyle (died 1692), bisexual lawyer in London and an alleged lover of the writer Aphra Behn
John Hoyle (author) (d. 1797?), author of a dictionary of musical terms
John Hoyle (diplomat) (1927–2012), Australian public servant and diplomat